The word of the year is an annual publication by the Gesellschaft für deutsche Sprache, established in 1971 (on a regular basis since 1977). Each December, a German word or word group is named in a linguistic review of the year.

See also
 Word of the year
 Un-word of the year
 Youth word of the year (Germany)

References

Germany
German language
1971 establishments in Germany